= Niten Chandra =

Indian Administrative Service officer

Niten Chandra (born 25 October 1965) is a retired IAS officer of Odisha cadre 1990 batch who served as Secretary, of the Department of Ex-Servicemen Welfare under the Ministry of Defence till his superannuation. Previously, he served as Law Secretary of India.
